Karma is a 2015 Thai horror-drama film directed by Kanittha Kwanyu. It was selected as the Thai entry for the Best Foreign Language Film at the 89th Academy Awards but it was not nominated.

See also
 List of submissions to the 89th Academy Awards for Best Foreign Language Film
 List of Thai submissions for the Academy Award for Best Foreign Language Film

References

External links
 

2015 films
2015 drama films
Thai drama films
Thai-language films
Thai national heritage films